is a 1954 Japanese epic samurai drama film co-written, edited, and directed by Akira Kurosawa. The story takes place in 1586 during the Sengoku period of Japanese history. It follows the story of a village of desperate farmers who seek to hire rōnin (masterless samurai) to combat bandits who will return after the harvest to steal their crops.

At the time, the film was the most expensive film made in Japan. It took a year to shoot and faced many difficulties. It was the second-highest-grossing domestic film in Japan in 1954. Many reviews compared the film to westerns.

Seven Samurai is regarded as one of the greatest and most influential films in cinema history. Since its release, it has consistently ranked highly in critics' lists of greatest films, such as the BFI's Sight & Sound and Rotten Tomatoes polls. It was also voted the greatest foreign-language film of all time in BBC's 2018 international critics' poll. Its influence on the film industry has been unprecedented, and it is often regarded today as one of the most "remade, reworked, and referenced" films in cinema.

Plot

In 1586, a bandit gang discusses raiding a mountain village, but their chief decides to wait until after the harvest. The villagers overhear this and turn to Gisaku, the village elder and miller, who declares that they should hire samurai to protect them. Since they have no money and can only offer food as payment, Gisaku advises them to find hungry samurai.

Several villagers go into town and eventually find Kambei, an aging but experienced rōnin, whom they see rescuing a young boy held hostage by a cornered thief. A young samurai named Katsushirō asks to become Kambei's disciple. The villagers ask for Kambei's help, and though initially reluctant, he agrees. He then recruits his old comrade-in-arms Shichirōji, along with Gorobei, Heihachi, and Kyūzō, a taciturn master swordsman whom Katsushirō regards with awe. Kikuchiyo, a wild and eccentric samurai-poser, is eventually accepted as well after attempts to drive him away fail.

Arriving at the village, the samurai and farmers slowly begin to trust each other. Katsushirō meets Shino, a farmer's daughter disguised as a boy by her father, and sleeps with her despite knowing the difference in their social classes prohibits it. Later, the samurai are angered when Kikuchiyo brings them armor and weapons, which the villagers acquired by killing other samurai injured or fleeing from battle. Kikuchiyo angrily retorts that samurai are responsible for much of the suffering farmers endure, revealing he is an orphaned farmer's son. The samurai's anger turns to shame.

Kambei arms the villagers with bamboo spears and organizes them into squads to prepare defenses and train. Three bandit scouts are spotted; two are killed, while the survivor reveals the location of their encampment before being slain by the villagers. The samurai burn down the camp in a pre-emptive strike. Rikichi, a troubled villager aiding the samurai, breaks down when he sees his wife, who was kidnapped and made a concubine during a previous raid. Upon seeing Rikichi, she runs back into a burning hut to her death.  Heihachi is killed by a gunshot while stopping Rikichi from pursuing her. At Heihachi's funeral, the saddened villagers are inspired by Kikuchiyo, who raises a banner Heihachi made to represent the six samurai, Kikuchiyo, and the village.

When the bandits finally arrive, they are confounded by the new fortifications, which include a moat and high wooden fences. They burn the village's outlying houses, including Gisaku's mill. Gisaku's family tries to save him when he refuses to abandon it, but all perish except a baby rescued by Kikuchiyo. The bandits then besiege the village, but many are killed as the defenders thwart every attack.

The bandits possess three matchlock muskets. Kyūzō ventures out alone and captures one; an envious Kikuchiyo abandons his squad to bring back another. However, his absence allows a handful of bandits to infiltrate his post and kill several farmers, and Gorobei is slain defending his position. That night, Kambei predicts that the bandits will make one final assault due to their dwindling numbers. 

Meanwhile, Katsushirō and Shino's relationship is discovered by her father, who is enraged that her virginity has been taken and beats her. Kambei and the villagers intervene; Shichirōji reasons that such behavior is normal before battle and that they should be forgiven.

The next morning, the defenders allow the remaining bandits to enter the village and then ambush them. As the battle nears its end, the bandit chief hides in the women's hut and shoots Kyūzō dead with his musket. An enraged Kikuchiyo charges in and is shot as well, but kills the chief before dying. The remaining outlaws are slain.

Afterward, Kambei, Katsushirō and Shichirōji stand in front of the funeral mounds of their comrades, watching the joyful villagers sing while planting their crops. Katsushirō and Shino meet one last time, but their relationship has ended. Kambei says to Shichirōji that it is another pyrrhic victory for the samurai: "The victory belongs to those peasants. Not to us."

Cast

The seven samurai 

Villagers 
 Yukiko Shimazaki as Rikichi's wife
 Yoshio Kosugi as Mosuke, one of the farmers sent to town to hire the samurai

Others 
 Shinpei Takagi as the bandit chief
 Shin Otomo as the bandit second-in-command
 Haruo Nakajima as a bandit scout killed by Kyūzō
 Eijirō Tōno as a thief
 Atsushi Watanabe as a bun seller
 Toshio Takahara as Samurai with a Gun
 Jun Tatara as a coolie
 Sachio Sakai as a coolie
 Takeshi Seki as a coolie
 Tatsuya Nakadai (uncredited) as a samurai wandering through town

Production

Writing
Akira Kurosawa had originally wanted to direct a film about a single day in the life of a samurai. Later, in the course of his research, he discovered a story about samurai defending farmers. According to actor Toshiro Mifune, the film was originally going to be called Six Samurai, with Mifune playing the role of Kyūzō. During the six-week scriptwriting process, Kurosawa and his screenwriters realized that "six sober samurai were a bore—they needed a character that was more off-the-wall". Kurosawa recast Mifune as Kikuchiyo and gave him creative license to improvise actions in his performance. During the six-week scriptwriting process, the screenwriters were not allowed visitors or phone calls.

Kurosawa and the writers were innovative in refining the theme of the assembly of heroic characters to perform a mission. According to Michael Jeck's DVD commentary, Seven Samurai was among the first films to use the now-common plot element of the recruiting and gathering of heroes into a team to accomplish a specific goal, a device used in later films such as The Guns of Navarone, Sholay, the western remake The Magnificent Seven, and Pixar's animated film A Bug's Life. Film critic Roger Ebert speculates in his review that the sequence introducing the leader Kambei (in which the samurai shaves off his topknot, a sign of honor among samurai, in order to pose as a monk to rescue a boy from a kidnapper) could be the origin of the practice, now common in action movies, of introducing the main hero with an undertaking unrelated to the main plot.

Other plot devices such as the reluctant hero, romance between a local woman and the youngest hero, and the nervousness of the common citizenry, had appeared in other films before this but were combined in this film.

Set design
Kurosawa refused to shoot the peasant village at Toho Studios and had a complete set constructed at Tagata on the Izu Peninsula, Shizuoka. Although the studio protested against the increased production costs, Kurosawa was adamant that "the quality of the set influences the quality of the actors' performances... For this reason, I have the sets made exactly like the real thing. It restricts the shooting but encourages that feeling of authenticity."
He also spoke of the "intense labour" of making the film: "It rained all the time; we didn't have enough horses. It was just the kind of picture that is impossible to make in this country."

Filming
Long before it was released, the film had already become a topic of wide discussion. After three months of pre-production it had 148 shooting days spread out over a year—four times the span covered in the original budget, which eventually came to almost half a million dollars. Toho Studios closed down production at least twice. Each time, Kurosawa calmly went fishing, reasoning that the studio had already heavily invested in the production and would allow him to complete the picture. The film's final battle scene, originally scheduled to be shot at the end of summer, was shot in February in near-freezing temperatures. Mifune later recalled that he had never been so cold in his life.

Through the creative freedom provided by the studio, Kurosawa made use of telephoto lenses, which were rare in 1954, as well as multiple cameras which allowed the action to fill the screen and place the audience right in the middle of it. "If I had filmed it in the traditional shot-by-shot method, there was no guarantee that any action could be repeated in exactly the same way twice." He found it to be very effective and he later used it in movies that were less action-oriented. His method was to put one camera in the most orthodox shooting position, another camera for quick shots and a third camera "as a kind of guerrilla unit". This method made for very complicated shoots, for which Kurosawa choreographed the movement of all three cameras by using diagrams.

The martial arts choreography for the film was led by Yoshio Sugino of the Tenshin Shōden Katori Shintō-ryū. Initially Junzo Sasamori of the Ono-ha Itto-ryu was working along with Sugino, but he was asked by the Ministry of Education to teach in Europe during production.

Editing
During filming, Kurosawa quickly earned a reputation with his crew as the "world's greatest editor" because of his practice of editing late at night throughout the shooting. He described this as a practical necessity that is incomprehensible to most directors, who on major productions spent at least several months with their editors assembling and cutting the film after shooting is completed.

Soundtrack
Kurosawa had a heightened interest in the soundtracks of his films. For Seven Samurai, he collaborated for the seventh and penultimate time with friend and composer Fumio Hayasaka. Hayasaka was already seriously ill when Kurosawa visited him during the filming of Seven Samurai and he died prematurely of tuberculosis on October 15, 1955, at the age of 41, while Kurosawa was filming I Live in Fear, his next film, which Hayasaka was unable to complete.

Themes 
In analyzing the film's accuracy to sixteenth century Japan, Philip Kemp wrote, "to the farmers whose crops were pillaged, houses burned, womenfolk raped or abducted, the distinction between samurai warriors and bandit troupes became all but meaningless." Kemp notes how Kikuchiyo is "A farmer's son who wants to become a samurai, he can see both sides: yes, he rages, the farmers are cowardly, mean, treacherous, quite capable of robbing and killing a wounded samurai—but it's the samurai, with their looting and brutality, who have made the farmers that way. And the shamefaced reaction of his comrades makes it clear that they can't dispute the charge."

Kenneth Turan notes that the long runtime "reflects the entirety of the agricultural year, from planting to gorgeous blossoming to harvesting." Historian David Conrad notes that at the time of the movie's release, nearly half of the Japanese population was still employed in agriculture. Although farm incomes were already rising as part of the Japanese economic miracle that would transform rural and urban lives in the 1950s and 60s, many of the village conditions depicted in the movie were still familiar to audiences in 1954.

Release

Theatrical
At 207 minutes, including a five-minute intermission with music, Seven Samurai would be the longest picture of Kurosawa's career. Fearing that American audiences would be unwilling to sit through the entire picture, Toho Studios originally removed 50 minutes from the film for U.S. distribution. Similar edits were distributed around the world until the 1990s; since then the complete version is usually seen.

The film was released in the United States in 1955, initially under the title The Magnificent Seven. Following the 1960 release of the American remake The Magnificent Seven, the Japanese film's title reverted to its original Seven Samurai in the United States.

Home media
Prior to the advent of DVD, various edited versions were distributed on video, but most DVDs and Blu-rays contain Kurosawa's complete original version, including its five-minute intermission. Since 2006, the Criterion Collection's US releases have featured their own exclusive 2K restoration, whereas most others, including all non-US Blu-rays, have an older HD transfer from Toho in Japan.

4K restoration
In 2016, Toho carried out a six-month-long 4K restoration, along with Kurosawa's Ikiru (1952). As the whereabouts of Seven Samurais original negative are unknown, second generation fine grain positive and third generation duplicate negative elements were used. As of 2020, this version has not been released anywhere on home video. It is available as a Digital Cinema Package from the British Film Institute.

Reception

Box office

Overseas, the box office income for the film's 1956 North American release is currently unknown. The film's 2002 re-release grossed $271,841 in the United States and $4,124 in France. At the 2002 Kurosawa & Mifune Festival in the United States, the film grossed $561,692. This adds up to at least $833,533 grossed in the United States.

Other European re-releases between 1997 and 2018 sold 27,627 tickets.

Critical response
While it initially received mixed reviews from Western critics, Seven Samurai is now considered one of the greatest films in cinema history. The site's critical consensus reads: "Arguably Akira Kurosawa's masterpiece, The Seven Samurai is an epic adventure classic with an engrossing story, memorable characters, and stunning action sequences that make it one of the most influential films ever made". It currently ranks 18th on their action/adventure voting list, and third on their top 100 art house and international films.

Upon its initial US release as The Magnificent Seven, film critic Wanda Hale reviewed the film in New York Daily News and rated it four stars in 1956. She noted it was very different from Kurosawa's previous films Rashomon (1950) and Gate of Hell (1953) in that it was "an action picture" but that Kurosawa "has exceeded himself" with "The Magnificent Seven." She praised Kurosawa's storytelling for "his deep perception of human nature" and "awareness that no two people are alike," his "sensitive, knowing direction" that "never lets audiences lose interest" in the plot development, his talent for making the battle scenes and violent action "terrifically exciting to audiences" and his ability to naturally weave humor and romance between the serious action. She also praised the "inspired performances" of the cast, including Takashi Shimura and Toshiro Mifune, among other actors.

Many critics outside of Japan have compared the film to westerns. Bosley Crowther, writing for The New York Times, said the film "bears cultural comparison with our own popular western High Noon. That is to say, it is a solid, naturalistic, he-man outdoor action film, wherein the qualities of human strength and weakness are discovered in a crisis taut with peril." Film historian Peter Cowie quoted Kurosawa as saying, "Good westerns are liked by everyone. Since humans are weak, they want to see good people and great heroes. Westerns have been done over and over again, and in the process, a kind of grammar has evolved. I have learned from this grammar of the western." Cowie continues this thought by saying, "That Seven Samurai can be so seamlessly transposed to an American setting underlines how carefully Kurosawa had assimilated this grammar."

In 1982, it was voted number three in the Sight & Sound critics' poll of greatest films. In the 2002 Sight & Sound critics' poll the film was ranked at number eleven. In the Sight & Sound directors' poll, it was voted at number ten in 1992 and number nine in 2002. It also ranked number seventeen on the 2012 Sight & Sound critics' poll, in both cases being tied with Kurosawa's own Rashomon (1950). It also ranked at number seventeen in 2012 Sight & Sound directors' poll.

In 1998, the film was ranked at number five in Time Out magazine's Top 100 Films (Centenary). Entertainment Weekly voted it the 12th Greatest film of all time in 1999. In 2000, the film was ranked at No.23 in The Village Voices 100 Greatest Films list. In January 2002, the film was voted at No. 81 on the list of the "Top 100 Essential Films of All Time" by the National Society of Film Critics.

In 2007, the film was ranked at No. 3 by The Guardians readers' poll on its list of "40 greatest foreign films of all time". The film was voted at No. 57 on the list of "100 Greatest Films" by the prominent French magazine Cahiers du cinéma in 2008. In 2009 the film was voted at No. 2 on the list of The Greatest Japanese Films of All Time by Japanese film magazine Kinema Junpo. Seven Samurai was ranked number one on Empire magazine's list of "The 100 Best Films of World Cinema" in 2010.

Film critic Roger Ebert added it to his list of Great Movies in 2001. Martin Scorsese included it on a list of "39 Essential Foreign Films for a Young Filmmaker." It was also listed by Russian filmmaker Andrei Tarkovsky as one of his top ten favorite films.

Kurosawa both directed and edited many of his films, including Seven Samurai. In 2012, the Motion Picture Editors Guild listed Seven Samurai as the 33rd best-edited film of all time based on a survey of its members. It was voted the greatest foreign-language film of all time in BBC's 2018 poll of 209 critics in 43 countries. In 2019, when Time Out polled film critics, directors, actors and stunt actors, Seven Samurai was voted the second best action film of all time. In 2021 the film was ranked at number 7 on Time Out magazine's list of "The 100 Best Movies of All Time".

Home media
As of 2017, Seven Samurai is the best-selling home video title ever released by the British Film Institute.

Legacy
Seven Samurai was a technical and creative watershed that became Japan's highest-grossing movie and set a new standard for the industry. It has remained highly influential, often seen as one of the most "remade, reworked, referenced" films in cinema.

There have been pachinko machines based on Seven Samurai in Japan. Seven Samurai pachinko machines have sold 94,000 units in Japan , equivalent to an estimated  in gross revenue.

 Remakes 

Its influence can be most strongly felt in the Western The Magnificent Seven (1960), a film specifically adapted from Seven Samurai. Director John Sturges took Seven Samurai and adapted it to the Old West, with the samurai replaced by gunslingers. Many of The Magnificent Sevens scenes mirror those of Seven Samurai. The film's title itself comes from the US localized title of Seven Samurai, which was initially released under the title The Magnificent Seven in the United States in 1955. However, in an interview with R. B. Gadi, Kurosawa expressed how "the American copy of The Magnificent Seven is a disappointment, although entertaining. It is not a version of Seven Samurai". Stephen Prince argues that considering samurai films and Westerns respond to different cultures and contexts, what Kurosawa found useful was not their content but rather he was inspired by their levels of syntactic movement, framing, form and grammar.

The Invincible Six (1970), an American action film directed by Jean Negulesco, has been described as "a knockoff of the Seven Samurai/Magnificent Seven genre set in 1960s Iran."

Battle Beyond the Stars (1980) is an American science fiction film directed by Jimmy T. Murakami and produced by Roger Corman. The film, intended as a "Magnificent Seven in outer space", is based on the plots of The Magnificent Seven and Seven Samurai. The movie acknowledges its debt to Seven Samurai by calling the protagonist's homeworld Akir and its inhabitants the Akira.

The plot of Seven Samurai was re-worked for The Seven Magnificent Gladiators (1983), an Italian sword-and-sandal film.

The 2004 video game Seven Samurai 20XX is a re-telling of Seven Samurai in a futuristic setting.

The steampunk anime series Samurai 7 (2004) is based on Seven Samurai.

Some film critics have noted similarities between Pixar's A Bug's Life (1998) and Seven Samurai.

Several elements from The Seven Samurai are also argued to have been adapted for Star Wars (1977). Plot elements of Seven Samurai are also used in the Star Wars Anthology film Rogue One (2016). The Clone Wars episode "Bounty Hunters" (2008) pays direct homage to Akira Kurosawa by adapting the film's plot, as does The Mandalorian episode "Chapter 4: Sanctuary" (2019).

Seven Swords (2005), a Hong Kong wuxia film produced and directed by Tsui Hark, has a plot revolving around seven warriors helping villagers to defend against mercenaries in homage to Seven Samurai.

Cultural impact
Seven Samurai is largely touted as what made the "assembling the team" trope popular in movies and other media. This has since become a common trope in many action movies and heist films. Seven Samurai spawned its own subgenre of "men-on-a-mission" films, also known as the "Seven Samurai formula" where "a team of disparate characters are grouped to undertake a specific mission." The formula has been widely adopted by many films and other media. Along with remakes already listed above, other examples of the "Seven Samurai formula" can be seen in films such as Saving Private Ryan (1998), The Dirty Dozen (1967), Star Wars (1977), The Savage Seven (1968), The 13th Warrior (1999), The Expendables and Avengers: Endgame. as well as television series such as The A-Team and The Walking Dead.

According to Stephen Prince, the film's "racing, powerful narrative engine, breathtaking pacing, and sense-assaulting visual style" (what he calls a "kinesthetic cinema" approach to "action filmmaking and exciting visual design") was "the clearest precursor" and became "the model for" the Hollywood blockbuster "brand of moviemaking" that emerged in the 1970s. The visuals, plot, dialogue and film techniques of Seven Samurai inspired a wide range of filmmakers, ranging from Steven Spielberg and George Lucas to Martin Scorsese and Quentin Tarantino. According to Prince, Kurosawa was "a mentor figure" to an emerging generation of American filmmakers, such as Spielberg and Lucas, who went on to develop the Hollywood blockbuster format in the 1970s.

Elements from Seven Samurai have been borrowed by many films. Examples include plot elements in films such as Three Amigos (1986) by John Landis, borrowed scenes in George Miller's Mad Max: Fury Road (2015), and various elements (including visual elements and the way the action, suspense and movement are presented) in the large-scale battle scenes of films such as The Lord of the Rings: The Two Towers (2002), The Matrix Revolutions (2003) and numerous Marvel Studios films. The opening action scene (where the hero is introduced in an action scenario unrelated to the rest of the plot) later seen in many action films (such as the James Bond films) has origins in Seven Samurai, with its opening action scene where Kambei poses as a monk to save a boy from a kidnapper. A visual element from Seven Samurai that has inspired a number of films is the use of rain to set the tone for action scenes; examples of this include Blade Runner (1982), The Lord of the Rings: The Two Towers, and The Matrix Revolutions. Seven Samurai's film editing technique of cutting on motion and the mentor-student dynamics in the plot (also seen in other Kurosawa films) have also been widely adopted by Hollywood blockbusters (such as Marvel films).

Sholay (1975), a "Curry Western" Indian film written by Salim–Javed (Salim Khan and Javed Akhtar) and directed by Ramesh Sippy, has a plot that was loosely styled after Seven Samurai. Sholay became the most commercially successful Indian film and revolutionized Hindi cinema. Later Indian films inspired by Seven Samurai include Mani Ratnam's Thalapathi (1991) and the Hindi film China Gate (1998).

Director Zack Snyder said, "Bruce [Wayne] is having to go out and sort of ‘Seven Samurai' the Justice League together” in the 2021 film Zack Snyder's Justice League. According to Bryan Young of Syfy Wire, the Marvel Cinematic Universe films The Avengers (2012) and Avengers: Infinity War (2018) also owe "a great debt to" Seven Samurai, noting a number of similar plot and visual elements. Other examples of films that reference Seven Samurai include the Australian science fiction film Mad Max 2: The Road Warrior (1981), the American comedy film Galaxy Quest (1999), and the 2016 remake of The Magnificent Seven.

Awards and nominations
Venice Film Festival (1954)
 Winner - Silver Lion - Akira Kurosawa
 Nominated - Golden Lion - Akira Kurosawa

Mainichi Film Award (1955)
 Winner - Best Supporting Actor - Seiji Miyaguchi

British Academy Film Awards (1956)
 Nominated - BAFTA Award for Best Film
 Nominated - BAFTA Award for Best Foreign Actor - Toshiro Mifune
 Nominated - BAFTA Award for Best Foreign Actor - Takashi Shimura

Academy Awards (1957)
 Nominated - Best Art Direction-Set Decoration, Black-and-White - So Matsuyama
 Nominated - Best Costume Design, Black-and-White - Kohei Ezaki

Jussi Awards (1959)
 Winner - Best Foreign Director - Akira Kurosawa
 Winner''' - Best Foreign Actor - Takashi Shimura

See also
 List of films considered the best
 List of historical drama films of Asia
 Edo no Gekitou'' a 1979 Japanese jidaigeki drama inspired by the film and produced by Toho
 List of films with a 100% rating on Rotten Tomatoes, a film review aggregator website

Notes

References

External links

 
 
 
 
 
 A Time of Honor: Seven Samurai and Sixteenth-Century Japan an essay by Philip Kemp at the Criterion Collection
 The Hours and Times: Kurosawa and the Art of Epic Storytelling an essay by Kenneth Turan at the Criterion Collection

 
1954 films
Japanese black-and-white films
Films scored by Fumio Hayasaka
Films directed by Akira Kurosawa
Films produced by Sōjirō Motoki
Films set in feudal Japan
Films set in the 1580s
Japanese epic films
1950s Japanese-language films
Jidaigeki films
Samurai films
Films with screenplays by Akira Kurosawa
Films with screenplays by Hideo Oguni
Films with screenplays by Shinobu Hashimoto
Sengoku period in fiction
Siege films
Toho films
Historical epic films
Japanese action drama films
1954 drama films
1950s Japanese films